Beiqi may refer to:

Northern Qi (550–577; 北齊/北齐 Běi Qí), a dynasty in North China during the Northern and Southern Dynasties period
BAIC Group (北汽 Běiqì), Chinese automobile and machine manufacturers, abbreviated as Beiqi in Chinese
Foton Motor, also known as Beiqi Foton Motor, a subsidiary of BAIC Group
Astragalus membranaceus (北芪 běiqí), used in traditional Chinese medicine